Hayravank is a village in the Gavar Municipality of the Gegharkunik Province of Armenia. The village is the site of the 9th-century Hayravank Monastery.

Etymology 
The village is also known as Ayrivan.

Gallery

References

External links 

 
 
 

Populated places in Gegharkunik Province